Gimnasia may refer to:

Club de Gimnasia y Esgrima La Plata, an Argentine football club
Club Gimnasia y Esgrima de Mendoza, an Argentine football club
Gimnasia Esgrima Comodoro Rivadavia, an Argentine football club
Gimnasia y Esgrima de Comodoro Rivadavia, an Argentine basketball and handball club
Gimnasia y Esgrima de Jujuy, an Argentine football club
Gimnasia y Tiro de Salta, an Argentine football club
Gimnasia y Esgrima de Santa Fe, an Argentine football club
Club Gimnasia y Esgrima (Concepción del Uruguay), an Argentine football club
Gimnàstic de Tarragona, a Spanish football club
Gymnasts, people who participate in the sports of either artistic gymnastics or rhythmic gymnastics